Le Monstre (French for "The Monster") is a wooden roller coaster at La Ronde amusement park in Montreal, Quebec, Canada. Le Monstre is the largest wooden roller coaster in Canada and is also the tallest two-track wooden roller coaster in the world.

The first track of the ride opened in 1985, but a second track was built for the 1986 season. This newer track does not run parallel to the first and instead gives a different ride experience. La Ronde once replaced the seats for new seats with safety belts, but were removed to classic bars at the request of riders.  The seats have one lap bar for each row, as well as an individual seatbelt that attaches to the seat divider instead of the seat. This allows riders to "float" during airtime because the seatbelt does not come down to the seat even when fully tightened. New trains built by Philadelphia Toboggan Coasters were added in 2013.

The ride was constructed by Martin & Vleminckx.

Requirements and the ride 

Riders are seated 2 across in 2 rows spanning 5 cars, for a total of 20 riders per train. Le Monstre has four trains, two on each track.

References

External links 
 Description of Monstre at La Ronde official website
 Rollercoaster database 

La Ronde (amusement park)
Roller coasters in Quebec
Roller coasters operated by Six Flags
1985 establishments in Quebec